Huilai Monument Archaeology Park is an archaeological site at Xitun District, Taichung, Taiwan.

History
The site was discovered by Tunghai University student Chen Sheng-ming in 2002. Further investigation revealed the site coverage to be 1,500,000 m2 and the Taichung City Government declared the area to be a City Archaeological Area. Later on, the city government decided to turn the area into a park and manufactured a replica of the excavation site.

See also
 Prehistory of Taiwan

References

2002 archaeological discoveries
Archaeological sites in Taiwan
Buildings and structures in Taichung
Taichung's 7th Redevelopment Zone